Terry Billups (born February 9, 1975) is a former American football defensive back. He played for the Dallas Cowboys in 1998, the New England Patriots in 1999 and for the Los Angeles Xtreme and Hamilton Tiger-Cats in 2001.

References

1975 births
Living people
American football defensive backs
North Carolina Tar Heels football players
Dallas Cowboys players
Scottish Claymores players
Rhein Fire players
New England Patriots players
Los Angeles Xtreme players
Hamilton Tiger-Cats players